Valeriy Vasylovych Dvoynikov (born 4 May 1950 in Ozersk) is a Ukrainian judoka who competed for the Soviet Union in the 1976 Summer Olympics.

In 1976 he won the silver medal in the middleweight.

He was also vice world champion in Vienna (1975) and 4 times European champion.

Isao Inokuma said that "Among the foreign judoists with brilliant shin-gi-tai (spirit, skill, and power) are the Soviet Union's Nevzorov, the victor in the light-middleweight class in the Montreal Olympics, Dvoinikov of the Soviet Union, who was runner-up in the middleweight division at the same Olympics, and Lorentz of East Germany, who won the 95-kilograms-and-under class in the Jigoro Kano Cup International Judo Tournament held in Tokyo in 1978".

He is also a co-founder in 2016 with his son, a politologue and poet Valery Dvoinikov, of the Peter the Great's International Foundation working for the cultural reconciliation between Europe and Russia.

References

 http://en.alljudo.net/judo-player-123.html
 https://web.archive.org/web/20110819041105/http://judo-ozersk.ru/dvoynikov.html
 http://www.musatovs.ru/dvoinikov.html
 http://www.dvoinikov.info/

1950 births
Living people
Russian male judoka
Ukrainian male judoka
Soviet male judoka
Olympic judoka of the Soviet Union
Olympic silver medalists for the Soviet Union
Olympic medalists in judo
Medalists at the 1976 Summer Olympics
Judoka at the 1976 Summer Olympics